KLEA may refer to:

 KLEA (FM), a radio station (95.7 FM) licensed to serve Hobbs, New Mexico, United States
 KLEA (AM), a defunct radio station (630 AM) formerly licensed to serve Lovington, New Mexico
 KLEA-FM (101.7 MHz), a defunct radio station (101.7 FM) formerly licensed to serve Lovington, New Mexico
 Battle of Abu Klea